Nichels Engineering was an American racing car builder and team owner. It was run by crew chief / mechanic Ray Nichels.

History
It competed in many genres of racing starting in Midget car racing. From there, the team progressed to Indy cars including the Indianapolis 500, land speed records, and NASCAR Grand National Series. After driver Paul Goldsmith won the 1957 Daytona Beach Road Course race, Nichels became the primary car builder for Pontiac; it took over the role for all of the Chrysler products in 1963. Nichels-built stock cars won national races in USAC, NASCAR, Automobile Racing Club of America (ARCA) and International Motor Contest Association (IMCA). The team won the 1961 and 1962 USAC Stock Car championship with Goldsmith and the 1967 championship with Don White.

Awards
Ray Nichels was named to the National Midget Auto Racing Hall of Fame in 2010.

World Championship Indy 500 results

Autobiographies
Conversations with a Winner - The Ray Nichels Story, William LaDow. LaDow Publishing, July 2014 (scheduled)

References

External links 
 Ray Nichels biography at LaDow Publishing website
 

Formula One constructors (Indianapolis only)
American racecar constructors
NASCAR teams